The international border states are those states in the U.S. that border either the Bahamas, Canada, Cuba, Mexico, or Russia. With a total of nineteen of such states, fourteen (including Alaska) lie on the U.S.–Canada border, four on the U.S.–Mexico border, and one consists of a maritime borders with Cuba and The Bahamas.

Border with Canada 
Thirteen states lie on the U.S.–Canada border. The U.S. states of Indiana, Illinois, and Wisconsin do not share a direct geographic border with Canada. They do, however, possess customs facilities due to their place along the Great Lakes, which leads to the Canadian border. (All three states connect Lake Michigan, while Wisconsin also connects to Lake Superior).

Border with Mexico 

Four states lie on the U.S.–Mexico border.

Borders with other countries 
In addition to the states bordering on Canada and Mexico, the U.S. state of Florida shares maritime boundaries with Cuba and the Bahamas, and Alaska shares a water boundary with Russia (in addition to its land border with Canada).

See also 
Borders of the United States
List of regions of the United States
Northern Tier (United States)

References 

Borders of U.S. states
Canada–United States border
Geography of the United States
Mexico–United States border